Bauta may refer to:
Bauta, Cuba, a city and municipality 
The bauta mask, a mask traditionally worn for the Carnival of Venice
Bauta (stone), a large upright standing stone